Schlatter Glacier is a glacier descending from the Asgard Range toward Lake House in Pearse Valley, Victoria Land, Antarctica. Named by Advisory Committee on Antarctic Names (US-ACAN) for Roberto P. Schlatter, Chilean biologist who worked in the United States Antarctic Research Program (USARP) bird-banding program relative to the Adelie penguin and the south polar skua, at Cape Crozier in the 1969-70 and 1970-71 seasons.

Glaciers of the Asgard Range
McMurdo Dry Valleys